Qashqay is a village in Abbas-e Sharqi Rural District, Tekmeh Dash District, Bostanabad County, East Azerbaijan Province, Iran. At the 2006 census, its population was 86, in 24 families.

References

External links
 Google Earth view

Populated places in Bostanabad County